Derek Arthur Jelley (born 4 March 1972) is a former professional rugby union player who appeared 145 times for  Leicester Tigers between 1993–2003, 23 times for Wakefield and once for Rotherham Titans.  Jelley played both loosehead and tighthead prop.

Career

Leicester
Jelley joined Leicester in 1992 at 21.  His debut came on 4 April 1993 away to Rugby on the final day of the 1992-93 Courage League season. Jelley was regular understudy for Graham Rowntree with one of the two starting every game at loosehead prop between 2 September 1993 – 6 November 1996 until the emergence of Perry Freshwater forced Jelley onto the tighthead side of scrum.  A shoulder injury kept Jelley out of action for four months and limited him to only three starts in Tigers 1997–98, however the following campaign was his best with a club-leading 35 appearances in the 1998–99 season, including 20 starts, as Leicester won the Premiership that season.  Jelley's appearances became more limited as Freshwater was preferred as reserve loosehead and Ricky Nebbett was signed to cover tighthead.  His final Leicester appearance was on 23 January 2003 at Welford Road in the Heineken Cup against Neath.

Wakefield and Rotherham
Jelley joined Wakefield on loan for the 2002–03 National Division One season. After making his debut on 31 August 2002 against Exeter Chiefs he made 23 appearances for the Yorkshire club that season. He joined Rotherham in the summer of 2003 following their promotion to the Premiership but suffered a career ending shoulder injury in his only game for the club.

References

1972 births
Living people
English rugby union players
Leicester Tigers players
Rugby union players from Nuneaton
Rugby union props